Thompson–Campbell Farmstead, also known as the Philip Austin and Susan Buckham Thompson Farmstead, is a historic home and farm located near Langdon, Atchison County, Missouri. The farmhouse was built in 1871, and is a 2 1/2-story, Italianate style brick dwelling with a two-story rear ell. It features a one-story front porch supported by fluted Doric order columns that replaced an earlier porch in 1905.  Also on the property are the contributing icehouse and shed (c. 1900).

It was listed on the National Register of Historic Places in 2003.

References

Farms on the National Register of Historic Places in Missouri
Italianate architecture in Missouri
Houses completed in 1871
Buildings and structures in Atchison County, Missouri
National Register of Historic Places in Atchison County, Missouri